The Berea Union Depot is a train station in Berea, Ohio, United States, which was built in 1876. As the railroad facilities through town grew, there was a demand in the early 1870s by developers and townspeople for a new passenger and freight station. When it was dedicated on May 3, 1876, The Plain Dealer called it "the finest facility outside the big cities." As a union station, it served the Lake Shore and Michigan Southern Railway and the Cleveland, Cincinnati, Chicago and St. Louis Railway, both of which became part of New York Central Railroad.  It ceased to serve as a railway depot in 1954.  In 1980, the building was restored as a restaurant and gathering place.

Built of sandstone with elements of slate, the depot is a Gothic Revival structure with Victorian-influenced components.  Both the sandstone and the styling are uncommon in northeastern Ohio, where masonry depots were typically brick, and where wooden stations outnumbered masonry.

Critical to the station's establishment was Berea's stone-based economy; in the late nineteenth century, the city's sandstone quarries were the world's largest, and a typical day in the 1880s saw eighteen trains at the station.  One century later, the depot was named a historic site: it was added to the National Register of Historic Places in November 1980, qualifying because of its place in local history and because of its historically significant architecture.

References

External links

Berea Union Depot Tavern
Existing Railroad Stations in Cuyahoga County, Ohio

Railway stations in the United States opened in 1876
Railway stations closed in 1954
Berea, Ohio
Transportation buildings and structures in Cuyahoga County, Ohio
Former railway stations in Ohio
Gothic Revival architecture in Ohio
National Register of Historic Places in Cuyahoga County, Ohio
Railway stations on the National Register of Historic Places in Ohio
Former New York Central Railroad stations
Sandstone buildings in the United States